Premagovce is a settlement in the Gorjanci Hills in the Municipality of Krško in eastern Slovenia, right on the border with Croatia. The area is part of the traditional region of Lower Carniola. It is now included in the Lower Sava Statistical Region.

References

External links
Premagovce on Geopedia

Populated places in the Municipality of Krško